Riccardo Secondo (born 9 September 1995) is an Italian footballer who plays as a midfielder for Eccellenza club Biellese.

Club career
He made his Serie B debut for Pro Vercelli on 18 May 2013 in a game against Cesena.

On 2 August 2018, he left Pro Vercelli for Gozzano in a temporary deal along with Lorenzo Grossi. He remained in the "rossobù" team for the 2019–20 season too.

References

External links
 

1995 births
People from Vercelli
Footballers from Piedmont
Sportspeople from the Province of Vercelli
Living people
Italian footballers
Association football midfielders
Serie B players
Serie C players
Eccellenza players
F.C. Pro Vercelli 1892 players
U.S. Città di Pontedera players
A.C.N. Siena 1904 players
A.C. Cuneo 1905 players
A.C. Gozzano players
A.S.D. La Biellese players